Ambitiouz Entertainment is a South African independent record label owned and founded by Kgosi Mahumapelo. The label was founded in April 2015 and houses notable acts including, G-Star Da Hustler, Lucky Man, MeekTrapBorn, Kid Tini and Kiddest Gola.

History

2014–2016: Birth and growth
The label was birthed in the first half of 2014, boasting 3 unknown acts, namely Emtee, Fifi Cooper and B3nchMarQ. In just a few months, these acts were considered some of the biggest names in the South African music industry, thus cementing Ambitiouz Entertainment as one of the most sought after record labels in South Africa.

2017: A-Reece, Fifi Cooper, B3nchMarQ & Flvme exit & controversy
The record label went under much scrutiny after artists Fifi Cooper, B3nchMarQ, A-Reece, and Flvme left the label in a very public and ugly fight. The artists claimed that they decided to part ways with the record label due to financial disagreements.

In late 2017, the record label filed a lawsuit against former artist Cooper, banning her from performing any and all songs that she had released while under the label. This caused an uproar from fans and supporters of the artist. The political party EFF stepped in to assist Cooper in the legal battle, which she eventually won.

2018-2020: Amanda Black lawsuit and more exits 
Mid-2018, their biggest act at the time, Amanda Black announced that she would be parting ways with the controversial record label and signed a joint-venture with Sony Music Entertainment. She then proceeded to sue the record label for over 1 million Rand that was owed to her for unpaid performances, which she won. Following Amanda Black's exit were Emtee, Priddy Ugly, Gigi Lamayne, KLY, DJ Citi Lyts, Saudi & NEO. In May 2020, Sjava departed the label.

2021-present: Blaq Diamond exit 
The duo were guests in "Podcast and Chill with MacG" were they announced that they've parted ways with Ambitiouz Entertainment in December 2021 on good terms, also indicating that they wanted to focus on the international market even though the label does well in the local market regarding their music. Malome Vector also parted ways with Ambitiouz Entertainment later in the year after forming his own record label.

Discography

Studio albums

Extended plays

References

External links

2013 establishments in South Africa
South African independent record labels
Record labels established in 2013
Culture of Johannesburg
Companies based in Johannesburg
Johannesburg Region A